Helmut Rabis (born 14 March 1949) is a German former field hockey player. He competed in the men's tournament at the 1968 Summer Olympics.

References

External links
 

1949 births
Living people
German male field hockey players
Olympic field hockey players of East Germany
Field hockey players at the 1968 Summer Olympics
People from Saalekreis
Sportspeople from Saxony-Anhalt
20th-century German people